Harvester is an unincorporated community in St. Charles County, in the U.S. state of Missouri.  Much of the community has been annexed by St. Peters.

History 
A post office called Harvester was established in 1881, and remained in operation until 1901. The community was so named on account of wheat fields near the original town site.

References

Unincorporated communities in St. Charles County, Missouri
Unincorporated communities in Missouri